Kakkadampoyil, is a small village in Kozhikode district, Kerala, India bordered with Malappuram district. The village has recently emerged as a major tourist destination in the district.

Location
Kakkadampoyil is situated in koodaranhi Panchayat in kozhikode District near Nilambur. This hilltop village is one of the coolest tourist destinations in Malabar region. It is about 15 km from Koodaranhi, 19 km from Thiruvambady and 24 km from Nilambur. Calicut city is about 50 km from here. There are many indigenous tribal groups in this area.  It is set high on the Western Ghats, with altitudes ranging from 700 ft to 2100 ft. Kozhippara waterfalls are situated nearby here. KSRTC Buses are running services from Calicut and have few buses from Thiruvambady and Nilambur towns. There is also a continuous Jeep service from Koodaranhi town to Kakkadampoyil.

Tourism
A large number of tourists come to Kakkadampoyil to enjoy the cool climate and to stay away from the bustle of the city.

On the mountain ranges of the Western Ghats bordering Kerala. Kakkadampoyil village, an unexplored hill station 48  km away from Calicut &NILAMBURCity. Surrounded by forests, misty hill ranges, deserted roads, untouched waterfalls (Kozhippara waterfalls), make the village worth a visit.  Facilities for tourists are available.

Climate 
The year is divided into four seasons: Cold (Malayalam:ശൈത്യം (December to February)), Hot (Malayalam:മധ്യ വേനല്‍ (March to May)), South West Monsoon (Malayalam:കാല വര്ഷം, (June to Sept) and North East monsoon (Malayalam: തുലാ വര്ഷം (Oct to Nov)). During the hot weather, the temperature goes up to a maximum of 30 C and in cold weather, the temperature drops to 15 C. The average rainfall is 2600 millimetres per year.

Geography
Kakkadampoyil stands on the Western top of the Western Ghats with dense forest, and deep valleys.  It is 24  km from Nilambur.  The Cherupuzha (Malayalam: ചെറുപുഴ) is one of the important tributaries of Chaliyar River (:ചാലിയാര്‍).

Economy
Agriculture is the mainstay of the economy.  Arecanut, coffee, Cocoa, Black pepper, Plantain, Vanilla and Coconut are the main crops. Poultry and Pig farms are the new trend.

In 2017 December, the Pinarayi Vijayan government decided to accord clearance to an 11 MW hydroelectric project in Kakkadampoyil. It will be the largest among the 20 small hydroelectric projects given clearance as part of the government's move to shift focus to micro level projects in the face of public resistance against large projects.

Neighboring villages
 Koodaranhi
Thiruvambady
Akampadam
 Nilambur 

 Vettilappara

Thottumukkam
Koombara

Rivers 
 Iruvanjippuzha 
 Chaliyar River

Access

 Nilambur Railway station 26 km.
 Calicut Railway Station 44 km. Well connected to all parts of the Country.
 Calicut International Airport (CCJ)) 50 km Well connected to Gulf Countries and have flight to other cities in India

KSRTC Bus service is available from KOZHIKODE VIA KUNNAMANGALAM-THIRUVAMBADY and  
Timings from KOZHIKODE  07:35 AM, 02:10 PM, 03:25 PM, 04:30 PM.

Also have few buses from Thiruvambady and Nilambur

See also
 Vendekumpoil 
 Nilambur 
 Thiruvampady
  Akampadam
 Anakkampoyil
 Vettilappara

External links 

Thamarassery area